Armands Zeiberliņš (born 13 August 1965) is a Latvian football manager and former international player, currently working as the head coach of FK Daugava Rīga in the Latvian Higher League.

Zeiberliņš played as a midfielder and obtained a total number of 23 caps for the Latvia national football team, scoring 4 goals. His last club was FC Volyn Lutsk in Ukraine. He also played in Sweden, Russia, Poland and Israel during his career. In May 2014 Zeiberliņš was appointed as the manager of FK Daugava Rīga.

Honours
Latvia
 Baltic Cup
 1993
 1995

References
 playerhistory

External links

1965 births
Living people
Soviet footballers
Latvian footballers
Latvia international footballers
FK Liepājas Metalurgs players
FC SKA Rostov-on-Don players
FC Shinnik Yaroslavl players
FC Volyn Lutsk players
FC Shakhtar Donetsk players
KSZO Ostrowiec Świętokrzyski players
Hapoel Be'er Sheva F.C. players
Hapoel Beit She'an F.C. players
FC Metalurh Zaporizhzhia players
Soviet Top League players
Ukrainian Premier League players
Liga Leumit players
Association football midfielders
Latvian expatriate footballers
Expatriate footballers in Ukraine
Latvian expatriate sportspeople in Ukraine
Expatriate footballers in Poland
Expatriate footballers in Israel
Expatriate footballers in Sweden
Expatriate footballers in Russia
Latvian expatriate sportspeople in Russia
Latvian expatriate sportspeople in Poland
Latvian expatriate sportspeople in Israel
Latvian expatriate sportspeople in Sweden
Latvian football managers
FK Daugava (2003) managers